John W. Carr (March 26, 1874 – June 14, 1932) was a North Dakota Republican Party politician who served as the 15th Lieutenant Governor of North Dakota under Governor George F. Shafer. Carr also served in the North Dakota House from 1923 to 1928.

Carr was born on March 26, 1874, in Fayette County, Iowa.  He married Marie Remmen (May 19, 1874 - March 4, 1920) on August 22, 1905, in Valley City, North Dakota.  They had four children: Edwin Remmen Carr, (June 11, 1906 - April 22, 1999), Mary Tora Carr McDonald (May 4, 1909 - November 2, 2003), William John Carr (February 8, 1915 - November 4, 1998), and Martha Marie Carr Oyen (October 5, 1917 - November 9, 1998).  He died on June 14, 1932, in Jamestown, North Dakota.  At the time of his death, Carr was a candidate for Governor of North Dakota.

References

Lieutenant Governors of North Dakota
1874 births
1932 deaths
Republican Party members of the North Dakota House of Representatives
People from Fayette County, Iowa
Speakers of the North Dakota House of Representatives
20th-century American politicians